Yūsuke Tanaka may refer to:
Yusuke Tanaka (footballer, born February 1986) (田中 佑昌), Japanese footballer
Yusuke Tanaka (footballer, born April 1986) (田中 裕介), Japanese footballer
Yusuke Tanaka (gymnast) (born 1989), Japanese gymnast